The Top of Iowa Conference is a high school athletic conference in northern Iowa. The schools range in size from 1A (the smallest classification in Iowa) to 3A (the second largest).

Beginning in 2015–16, the North Iowa Conference and the Corn Bowl Conference combined to create the Top of Iowa Conference with two divisions.

The Top of Iowa Conference–West includes Eagle Grove, Belmond–Klemme, Garner–Hayfield–Ventura, West Hancock, Forest City, Lake Mills, North Iowa, Bishop Garrigan, and North Union. The Top of Iowa Conference–East includes Osage, Mason City Newman, West Fork, North Butler, Central Springs, Northwood-Kensett, Rockford, St. Ansgar, and Nashua-Plainfield.

Members

East

West

References

External links
 

High school sports in Iowa